Nicole Henderson may refer to:

Nicole Henderson, character in The Great Mom Swap
Nicole Henderson, character in Almost Summer